Costești is a commune in the Buzău County, Muntenia, Romania. It is composed of six villages: Budișteni, Costești, Gomoești, Groșani, Pietrosu, and Spătaru.

Natives
 Ștefan Gușă

References

Communes in Buzău County
Localities in Muntenia